The Transition Player of the Year Award is given annually to the National Lacrosse League player who is chosen as the best transition player. This award debuted after the 2007 NLL season.

Past winners

References

Transition